Mahesh Babu is an Indian actor and producer known for his work in Telugu cinema. He first appeared in the 1979 film Needa when he was four years old. He continued to perform as a child actor in several films, most of which featured his father Krishna. Following his role as the titular protagonist in Balachandrudu (1990) while still a child, his career went on hiatus so he could concentrate on his education until taking on his first lead role as an adult in the 1999 film Raja Kumarudu, for which he won the Nandi Award for Best Male Debut. Afterwards, his career stagnated until successes like Murari (2001),  Okkadu (2003) and Athadu (2005) brought him fame. In 2006, he played a gangster in the Puri Jagannadh-directed action-thriller Pokiri. The film became the highest-grossing Telugu film of all time, and according to Vogue India, cemented Babu's reputation as a "superstar".

In the wake of the failures of Sainikudu (2006) and Athidhi (2007), Babu took a long-term break from cinema for personal reasons. His next project, the fantasy action film Khaleja, was released in 2010 after significant delays. In 2011, he starred in Dookudu, which became the first Telugu film to gross over 1 billion. Businessman (2012), his next film, was well received and became one of the year's highest grossing Telugu films at a time that was particularly harsh on other big-budget productions. The following year, Babu co-starred alongside Venkatesh in the critically and commercially acclaimed drama film Seethamma Vakitlo Sirimalle Chettu, which was considered the first Telugu multi-starrer in decades. He then featured in Sukumar's 2014 psychological thriller film 1: Nenokkadine. Although Babu's performance as a schizophrenic rock star was lauded by critics, the film itself received mixed reviews and failed to recover its budget. Aagadu, his next release that year, suffered a similar fate, despite the film's opening gross being his highest at the time.

His 2015 action-drama Srimanthudu was a commercial success and earned Babu his fifth Filmfare Award for Best Actor – Telugu as well as his eighth Nandi Award in any category, the most by any individual. The film was also his first as a producer. His subsequent film Brahmotsavam (2016) and his first bilingual film Spyder (2017) under-performed at the box office. The actor's next role was as an inexperienced chief minister in Koratala Siva's Bharat Ane Nenu (2018). The film was the year's second highest-grossing Telugu production and critics praised Babu's performance. His following two films, Vamshi Paidipally's action-drama Maharshi (2019) and Anil Ravipudi's action-comedy Sarileru Neekevvaru (2020), also made substantial profits despite receiving mixed reception. Babu's 2022 film Sarkaru Vaari Paata also received a mixed response, however, his performance was appreciated by critics.

Filmography 

All films in this list are in Telugu unless otherwise indicated.

As actor

Other roles

See also 
 List of awards and nominations received by Mahesh Babu
 G. Mahesh Babu Entertainment

Notes

References 

Indian filmographies
Male actor filmographies